Martín Vidaurre Kossmann (born 18 February 2000) is a Chilean cross-country mountain biker. He competed in the cross-country race at the 2020 Summer Olympics. He also won the bronze medal in the cross-country race at the 2019 Pan American Games.

Major results

2017
 1st  Cross-country, Pan American Junior Championships
 1st  Cross-country, National Junior Championships
2018
 1st  Cross-country, Pan American Junior Championships
2019
 1st  Cross-country, National Under-23 Championships
 Pan American Championships
2nd  Under-23 Cross-country
2nd  Team relay
 3rd  Cross-country, Pan American Games
2021
 1st  Cross-country, UCI World Under-23 Championships
 Pan American Championships
1st  Under-23 Cross-country
2nd  Short track
 1st  Overall UCI Under-23 XCO World Cup
1st Lenzerheide
1st Snowshoe
2nd Leogang
2nd Les Gets
2022
 Pan American Championships
1st  Under-23 Cross-country
3rd  Short track
 1st  Overall UCI Under-23 XCO World Cup
1st Petrópolis
1st Albstadt
1st Nové Město
1st Leogang
1st Snowshoe
1st Mont-Sainte-Anne
1st Val di Sole
2023
 1st  Overall Vuelta del Porvenir San Luis
1st Stage 5

References

References
 
 

2000 births
Living people
Chilean male cyclists
Pan American Games medalists in cycling
Pan American Games bronze medalists for Chile
Cyclists at the 2019 Pan American Games
Sportspeople from Santiago
Medalists at the 2019 Pan American Games
Cross-country mountain bikers
Cyclists at the 2018 Summer Youth Olympics
Cyclists at the 2020 Summer Olympics
Olympic cyclists of Chile
21st-century Chilean people